Copydex is a common latex-based rubber cement in the UK. It can be easily recognised by its characteristic "fishy" odour. It has been owned since 1986 by Henkel.

Uses
Also known as "fishy glue" this contact adhesive is commonly used when sticking a variety of materials, such as paper, board, upholstery, and carpet. It is used widely by model makers as a "mask" to protect areas during airbrushing. It can be used as an alternative to Table Tennis glue. Copydex is also frequently used to apply false eyelashes in the theatre to make sure they stay on during entire performances.

Composition
Unlike many other rubber cements, it consists of latex dissolved in water.  As such it is relatively non-toxic and so is frequently used in primary schools. It also contains ammonia to stabilise the rubber solution. This is the source of its characteristic smell.

References

Adhesives